Umesh Mijar is an Indian film actor, form Tulu Film Industries also known as Coastalwood popular among the regional audience for his work in movies like Daniklena, Joklu (2015), Pavithra – Beedida Ponnu (2016), Ashem Zalem Kashem (2017), and Appe Teacher (2018). He has worked in more than 22 films in Coastalwood. Mostly known for his comedy roles. Umesh Mijar is a popular Actor.

Filmography 

 Daniklena Joklu (2015)
Pavithra – Beedida Ponnu (2016)
Ashem Zalem Kashem (2017)
Appe Teacher (2018)
Umil (2018)
 Girgit (2019)

References 

Year of birth missing (living people)
Living people